Guatemala is a barrio in the municipality of San Sebastián, Puerto Rico. Its population in 2010 was 2,512.

The Guatemala River is located in Guatemala barrio.

History

Puerto Rico was ceded by Spain in the aftermath of the Spanish–American War under the terms of the Treaty of Paris of 1898 and became an unincorporated territory of the United States. In 1899, the United States Department of War conducted a census of Puerto Rico finding that the population of Guatemala barrio and Bahomamey barrio was 1,126.

A large sugar refinery operated in Guatemala until it went into disuse.

Sectors
Barrios (which are roughly comparable to minor civil divisions) in turn are further subdivided into smaller local populated place areas/units called sectores (sectors in English). The types of sectores may vary, from normally sector to urbanización to reparto to barriada to residencial, among others.

The following sectors are in Guatemala barrio:

Features
The Guatemala River passes through Guatemala in San Sebastián. There is a sports complex featuring a museum of an hacienda. San Sebastián Memorial is located in Guatemala.

Veredas Sports Complex 
Established in 2016 in Guatemala is the Veredas Sports Complex. The complex which consists of a modern skate park, a sand volleyball court, a zipline with four stations, a climbing and rappelling wall, an outdoor gym, a rope bridge, basketball and tennis courts, and walking paths, is set within an urban forest of about six thousand trees. Hacienda La Fe, an agriculture museum is located at the complex.

Gallery

See also

 List of communities in Puerto Rico
 List of barrios and sectors of San Sebastián, Puerto Rico

References

Barrios of San Sebastián, Puerto Rico